Autism Resource Centre (Singapore) or ARC(S) is a non-profit organisation based in Singapore and registered in year 2000. It was started by professional and parent volunteers dedicated to serving children and adults with Autism Spectrum Disorder (ASD) to help these individuals lead meaningful and independent lives in society.

Progammes 
ARC(S) has developed and launched the following key signature offerings:

 WeCAN Early Intervention Programme (WeCAN EIP) provides direct intervention to young children with autism 6 years and below using an effective autism curriculum that has been internally developed. WeCAN EIP is also the first internationally accredited early intervention programme in Asia by the National Autistic Society, United Kingdom since 2008. We currently serve 102 young children.
 Pathlight School, started by ARC(S), is the first autism-focused school offering Singapore's mainstream academic curriculum together with life readiness skills. The school caters to student with ASD and related disorders aged between 7 and 18 years of age who are cognitively able to access mainstream academic curriculum but require additional support such as smaller class sizes, special accommodations and teaching staff trained in autism. Pathlight has more than 1000 students enrolled at present in 3 educational programmes – Primary School, Secondary School and Vocational Track.
 Autism Intervention, Training and Consultancy Unit (AITC) which offers training endorsed by Singapore's government and social service agencies to empower more teachers, school leaders, professionals and family caregivers to support individuals affected by ASD (with more than 2000 training seats taken up per year). AITC also provides direct intervention services for individuals with ASD in education, employment, social and daily living skills. In addition, AITC provides consultancy services to Eden School, Eden Centre for Adults, Eden Children's Centre.
 Employability and Employment Centre (E2C) was officially launched on 19 March 2012 to serve the needs of teenagers and young adults with autism. The mission of the centre is to provide a stable and predictable environment where adults with autism can be trained in employability and vocational skills and become contributing members of the workforce. E2C has served more than 130 adult clients with autism since its inception and has successfully trained and placed close to 50 adults in various job placements.

Collaborations 
In 2005, ARC partnered with Starbucks to set up a cafe training facility for youth at ARC's special education school Pathlight School to train people with autism and provide them with skills. In 2014, Starbucks opened its 100th store in Singapore at The Fullerton Waterboat House, the store had six employees hired from ARC.

References

External links 
 Autism Resource Centre
 WeCAN Early Intervention

2000 establishments in Singapore
Autism-related organizations
Disability organisations based in Singapore
Child-related organisations in Singapore
Singaporean voluntary welfare organisations
Organizations established in 2000